Paul Mattei is a French Latinist, professor of Latin language and literature at the Lumière University Lyon 2, a specialist of the History of Christianity and its first period, and scientific advisor of the Institut des sources chrétiennes. His research focuses particularly on the Christian Latin authors of antiquity (third-fifth centuries) and medieval extensions (Merovingian and Carolingian times).

Works 
 Le Christianisme antique (Ier-Ve siècles), éditions Ellipses, Paris, 2002, 2004 and 2011
 Le Christianisme antique. De Jésus à Constantin, series "U", Armand Colin publisher, 2008 and 2011
 In collaboration with Serge Lancel, Pax et Concordia. Chrétiens des premiers siècles en Algérie (Ier-VIIe siècles), Alger, 2003 ; preface by André Mandouze ; postface dby Jean-Noël Guinot, directeur de l’Institut des sources chrétiennes
 In collaboration with Bernard Colombat, professor of Latin language and literature at the Stendhal University, direction du volume Curiosité historique et intérêts philologiques : Mélanges offerts à Serge Lancel, Recherches et travaux 54, University Stendhal (Grenoble-III), 1998

Translations and research books 
1988: Tertullian, Le Mariage unique (De monogamia). Introduction, critical text, translation and commentary, coll. Sources Chrétiennes n° 343, Éditions du Cerf
1997: Tertullian, Le Voile des vierges (De uirginibus uelandis). Introduction and commentary by E. Schuiz-Flügel, chercheur au Vetus Latina Institut (Beuron, RFA), adapted by P. Mattei, critical text by E. Schuiz-Flügel, translation by P. Mattei, series "Sources chrétiennes" n°424, Cerf
 Cyprian, L’Unité de l’Église (De ecclesiae catholicae unitate). Critical text by CCL 3 (M. Bévenot). Introduction by P. Siniscalco, emeritus professor at the Sapienza University of Rome, and P. Mattei. Translation by M. Poirier, honorary professor at the lycée Henri-IV, Paris. Apparats, notes, appendix and index by P. Mattei

External links 
 Bibliographie détaillée de Paul Mattei, site of the Sources Chrétiennes
 Le Christianisme antique (Ier-Ve siècles), site ASSR (Archives de sciences sociales des religions)
 Le Christianisme antique (Ier-Ve siècles) by Rémi Gounelle, cairn.info
 Réponse de Paul Mattei à Rémi Gounelle, site ASSR

French scholars of Roman history
Historians of Christianity
French Latinists
Latin–French translators
Living people
French historians of religion
Year of birth missing (living people)